Thomas Joseph Barrack Jr. (born April 28, 1947) is an American private equity real estate investor and the founder and executive chairman of Colony Capital, a publicly traded real estate investment trust (REIT). Barrack has for decades been a close friend of and fundraiser for former U.S. President Donald Trump, representing him in television news appearances. He was senior advisor to Trump's presidential campaign and served as the chairman of his Inaugural Committee. 

In 2021 and 2022, Barrack was indicted on nine charges stemming from his alleged lobbying for the United Arab Emirates (UAE) as an unregistered foreign agent. In November 2022, he was found not guilty on all charges.

Early life and education
Barrack's grandparents were Lebanese Christians who immigrated in 1900 to the United States from Zahlé, Lebanon. Barrack was raised in Culver City, California, where his father was a grocer and his mother was a secretary.

In 1969, Barrack earned a Bachelor of Arts degree from the University of Southern California (USC), where he participated on their varsity rugby team. He then attended the USC Gould School of Law, where he was an editor of the Southern California Law Review, before receiving a Juris Doctor from the University of San Diego School of Law in 1972.

Early career
Barrack's first job was at the law firm of Herbert W. Kalmbach, President Richard Nixon's personal lawyer. In 1972, the firm sent him to Saudi Arabia, where he soon became the squash partner of a Saudi prince. He then worked in the kingdom for the Fluor Corporation, and worked for Saudi princes. Shortly after, he helped open diplomatic relations between Saudi Arabia and Haiti, then ruled by Jean-Claude Duvalier, at the request of investor Lonnie Dunn.

In 1982, Barrack served as deputy undersecretary of the United States Department of the Interior under James G. Watt in the Reagan administration. The Secret Service would board its horses at Barrack's ranch when President Reagan was at his nearby Rancho del Cielo. Secretary Watt made his resignation announcement at Barrack's ranch. Barrack says he became disillusioned with government service after he was required to testify before a congressional committee due to a gift Barrack had paid to the purchaser of Edwin Meese's house.

Business career 
In 1987, Barrack was later a principal with the Robert M. Bass Group. In 1985, Barrack first dealt with Donald Trump when he sold Trump a one-fifth stake in the Alexander's department stores. In 1988, Trump agreed to pay Barrack $410 million for total ownership of the Plaza Hotel. He later lost both properties in bankruptcy.

In 1990, Barrack founded Colony Capital, with initial investments by Bass and GE Capital, and later Eli Broad, Merrill Lynch, and Koo Chen-fu. Barrack achieved 50% profits in his first two years by focusing on distressed properties, including the federal Resolution Trust Corporation. He has invested some $200 million in Middle East real estate, $534 million in non-performing German real estate loans, and made a $24 million loan to photographer Annie Leibovitz. He also owns Neverland Ranch which was once the home of mega superstar Michael Jackson. Through Colony Capital, he runs a $25 billion portfolio of assets, from the Fairmont Raffles Hotels International hotel chain in Asia, the Aga Khan's former resort in Sardinia, Resorts International Holdings, One&Only Resorts, Atlantis, etc.

Colony American Homes was criticized for treating tenants poorly during the Great Recession, raising rents, evicting people in large numbers and failing to maintain properties.

Barrack has previously negotiated drilling rights with Mana Al Otaiba. In 2009, Barrack negotiated with Otaiba's son, Ambassador Yousef Al Otaiba, the sale of a $41 million stake in the Raffles L'Ermitage hotel to the Abu Dhabi Investment Authority.

In 2010, Barrack bought $70 million of Jared Kushner's debt on 666 Fifth Avenue. Kushner later avoided bankruptcy when Barrack agreed to reduce his obligations after a request by Trump.

As of September 2011, Barrack was the 833rd richest person in the world, and the 375th richest in the United States, with an estimated wealth of US$1.1. billion. However, he was no longer a billionaire in 2014.

In 2012, Barrack sold the Paris Saint-Germain F.C. to the Qatar Investment Authority. Barrack had to pay €22 million to settle tax charges related to the 2012 sale of his resort on Costa Smeralda to the Qatari sovereign wealth fund.

In 2010, Barrack partnered with the Qatar Investment authority to purchase Weinstein film production company Miramax for $660 million. In 2016, Barrack sold Miramax to the Qatari beIN Media Group at a fourfold profit. In October 2017, Barrack's Colony Capital agreed to invest in The Weinstein Company to keep it afloat in light of the Harvey Weinstein sexual misconduct allegations. The New York Times reported that the preliminary agreement with Weinstein fell apart and the acquisition broke down. Colony Capital later withdrew from the deal after being unable to structure the purchase in a way to avoid enriching Harvey Weinstein.

Colony NorthStar merger 
On June 3, 2016, Barrack's Colony Capital announced an all-stock three-way merger of equals with two NorthStar affiliates combining his firm with NorthStar Realty Finance and NorthStar Asset Management. The new entity, renamed Colony NorthStar, would have managed $58BN in assets, making it the 5th largest real estate manager globally at that time. Management disclosed in regulatory filings that the newly formed Colony NorthStar would have a pro-forma equity market capitalization of $7 billion and total capitalization of $17 billion. On February 28, 2017 management gave full year guidance which estimated that core funds from operations ("FFO") would be between $1.40 – 1.58 per share while targeting dividends payments of $1.08 per share.  

However, regulator FINRA had just passed legislation modifying fee disclosures for REITs. The new legislation forced Colony NorthStar to disclose details regarding the fees it charged clients. The success of the merger relied on fees the company expected to earn from newly raised capital. In particular, retail management fees from Investment Management companies NorthStar/RXR NY Metro Real Estate and NorthStar Real Estate Capital Income Fund, which were raising a combined $5.2 billion, had been discussed throughout management presentations of the merger. The new legislation complicated Colony Capital ability to grow its capital fundraising business as clients balked at fee levels once FINRA/NASD passed the new disclosure rules. 

On March 1, 2018, management delivered 2017 full year financials which were significantly below previous guidance highlighting the difficulty in its fundraising business . Colony NorthStar not only reported core FFO at $1.16 per share, or 22% below previous midpoint management guidance, but also announced that it would cut its dividend by 60% to $0.44 per share and write down the Investment Management by $375 million. Upon announcement, the share price dropped 23% to close at $6.00 per share leaving the company with a market capitalization of approximately $3.2 billion, or a third of its pro-forma capitalization. On March 10, 2020, Colony Capital's share price closed at $3.41 giving the company a market capitalization of approximately $1.7 billion.

Other

In 2017, Barrack sold a $70 million stake in One California Plaza to the Abu Dhabi crown prince's investment fund. During the first eighteen months of the Trump Administration, Colony NorthStar raised 24% of its $7 billion in investment from the United Arab Emirates (UAE) or Saudi Arabia.

Barrack used Cayman Islands entities to invest pension fund money in distressed real estate and send money towards the Colony parent company, according to an organization chart that surfaced in the Paradise Papers documents leaked from the Appleby law firm

Barrack is a trustee at the University of Southern California. He has also served on the board of directors of Accor, Kerzner International, First Republic Bank, Continental Airlines, Korea First Bank, and Megaworld Properties & Holdings. French president Nicolas Sarkozy awarded him France's Chevalier de la Légion d'honneur.

Political activity
Barrack endorsed Donald Trump during the 2016 United States presidential election. He was a major fundraiser for Trump's campaign through the "Rebuilding America Now" Super PAC, which raised $23 million.

Barrack recommended that Trump hire Paul Manafort as his campaign manager. Barrack first met Manafort in the 1970s when they were both working for Saudis and living in Beirut. In 2007, Barrack had loaned Manafort $1.5 million to refinance a home in the Hamptons.

On April 26, 2016, Barrack began an email correspondence with one of his business partners, UAE Ambassador Yousef Al Otaiba, reassuring him that Trump had investments in the UAE. “The emails were the beginning of Mr. Trump’s improbable transformation from a candidate who campaigned against Muslims to a president celebrated in the royal courts of Riyadh and Abu Dhabi,” according to New York Times writer David D. Kirkpatrick, who characterized this as a testament to Barrack's "unique place in the Trump world". On May 26, Barrack wrote to Otaiba to introduce Jared Kushner, and the two met later that month. On July 13, Barrack conveyed to Otaiba that Trump had removed from the Republican Party platform the plank calling for the release of the 28 pages of redacted information from the 9/11 report. On July 21, Barrack spoke at the 2016 Republican National Convention. In September 2016, Barrack helped set up a meeting between Trump and the Emir of Qatar in Trump Tower, although, as Kilpatrick noted, none of the investments brought in from the gulf by Mr. Barrack's firm in the two years following that meeting came from Qatar. After Trump became president, Barrack continued to act as a middleman between him and Arab princes.

Barrack served as chairman of the committee overseeing the 2017 Trump inauguration, for which he raised over $100 million, doubling the previous record. Barrack hired Rick Gates, first to help run the inauguration and, following that, as a consultant for his company. Gates was fired from the latter position in October 2017, the day he was indicted.

In a 2017 Washington Post article, Barrack commented on Trump's inflammatory rhetoric and proposals to ban immigrants from certain Muslim countries and put up a border wall with Mexico. "He's better than this," he said. He denies a quote attributed to him in the 2018 book Fire and Fury, that Trump was "not only crazy" but "stupid".

Barrack was interviewed during the Special Counsel investigation into Russian interference in the 2016 election, in particular regarding Paul Manafort, Rick Gates, Konstantin Kilimnik, Cambridge Analytica, the Trump campaign, the Trump transition team, and the financing of the Trump inauguration.

In May 2019, it was reported that the Eastern District of New York had "raised questions" about inaugural committee donations, including committee chairman Barrack's ties to the Middle East.

Throughout the election campaign, transition period and inauguration process, Barrack is said to have had been in touch with people having ties in the ruling family of the United Arab Emirates, including Rashid al-Malik, a friend and business associate of Barrack and Yousef al-Otaiba UAE's ambassador to the US. According to a New York Times report published in July 2019, Barrack also exchanged emails with Malik, sharing with him a draft of Trump's energy policy speech to seek approval on the 'pro-gulf region language'. Malik, as per the emails, "circulated the draft among Emirati and Saudi officials" to seek further approval, followed by Mr. Barrack incorporating the language suggested by Malik in the draft sent to Paul Manafort, Trump's campaign chairman at the time.

In 2021, Barrack denied involvement in Trump's pardon of Robert Zangrillo, a developer and investor who was charged in the 2019 college admissions bribery scandal for his alleged role in getting his daughter accepted into USC. The White House had listed Barrack as a supporter of the pardon.

Barrack was allegedly directed by the UAE officials to meet the former congressman, Stephen E Stockman. Between February and 15 March 2017, the Emirates also asked Barrack to endorse the appointment of Stockman as the US Ambassador to the UAE. The Emirati plans were, however, interrupted after Stockman was arrested for stealing and using charity money for personal expenses.

Indictment for foreign lobbying

On July 20, 2021, Barrack and his business protege Matthew Grimes were indicted as an agent working at the direction of a foreign power, obstructing justice, and making false statements to law enforcement. He was jailed for two days before being released on $250 million bond secured by $5 million in cash. The indictment was broadened in May 2022 to include alleging Barrack sought hundreds of millions of dollars in investments from the United Arab Emirates while illegally lobbying the Trump administration on its behalf. 

In October 2022, in an interview with a State Department investigator, which was conducted to determine if or not Barrack would be a threat to the national security as an ambassador, he failed to provide names of the four Emiratis, who on behalf of the UAE government assigned Barrack to influence the Trump campaign. Barrack only mentioned the names of Al Waleed bin Talal Al Saud, Nacho Figueras and Roberto Hernandez Ramirez.

On November 4, 2022, Barrack and Matthew Grimes were both found not guilty.

Personal life
Barrack and his most recent wife divorced in 2016. He has six children. His family is based in Los Angeles, California. He also owns a 1,200-acre mountain ranch near Santa Barbara, California, as well as Happy Canyon Vineyards in the Happy Canyon of Santa Barbara AVA, and a tasting room in downtown Santa Barbara. He is Roman Catholic.

In 2014, Barrack bought a house in Santa Monica for $21 million, which he later sold for $35 million, the highest price for a residence in that area. In 2017, he purchased a $15.5 million home in Aspen, Colorado.

Barrack was reportedly a friend of hedge fund billionaire and convicted sex offender Jeffrey Epstein. In his 2018 book, Fire and Fury: Inside the Trump White House, journalist Michael Wolff referenced Barrack, together with Donald Trump, as a "set of nightlife musketeers" with Epstein throughout the 1980s and 1990s.

Awards and honors
2000, Golden Plate Award of the American Academy of Achievement
2005, Lloyd Greif Center for Entrepreneurial Studies’ Entrepreneur of the Year Award
2010, Chevalier de la Légion d’Honneur, an award bestowed by the French government for citizens and foreigners

See also
Timeline of Russian interference in the 2016 United States elections

References

American people of Lebanese descent
American Roman Catholics
Businesspeople from Los Angeles
Lawyers from Los Angeles
California Republicans
Living people
USC Gould School of Law alumni
1947 births
People named in the Paradise Papers